Ellen's Glen House is a facility providing services to elderly and mentally ill patients in Liberton, Edinburgh, Scotland. It is managed by NHS Lothian.

History
The hospital has its origins in Southfield House, a building situated near Ellen's Glen, a local nature reserve, which was designed by John Chesser in the Scottish baronial style. It opened as a tuberculosis sanatorium in 1875 and became part of the Royal Victoria Hospital in the 1920s.

A new hospital, which was commissioned to replace the Southfield House facility, was procured under a Private Finance Initiative contract in February 1999. It was built by James Walker (Leith) Limited just to the north of Southfield House at a cost of £2.65 million and opened as Ellen's Glen House in January 2000.

Services
The hospital provides services to elderly and mentally ill patients in a two floor building with 60 staffed beds set in extensive accessible gardens.  The services include frail adult complex clinical care and palliative care; according to inspection reports stays range from a few weeks to a number of years.

References

Hospitals in Edinburgh
NHS Scotland hospitals
Psychiatric hospitals in Scotland
NHS Lothian
Palliative care in Scotland
1999 establishments in Scotland